National Aquarium Denmark, Den Blå Planet is a public aquarium in Denmark. The original aquarium was located in Charlottenlund, but this facility closed in 2012 and most of the animal collection was relocated to the new and much larger aquarium Den Blå Planet (lit.: The Blue Planet) in Kastrup, a suburb of Copenhagen. The National Aquarium Denmark, Den Blå Planet opened to the public in March 2013 and is the largest aquarium in Northern Europe.

The main purpose of the aquarium is to disseminate marine information, help science projects, and help improve educational institutions.

The former aquarium
Denmark's Aquarium in Charlottenlund started construction in 1937 and was opened in 1939. In 1974, this aquarium was expanded to feature five large landscape aquaria and a biological museum with theme-based exhibits and aquariums. In 1990, the facility was further expanded by a new front hall, café, improved toilet facilities and a schooler service.

Current aquarium
Den Blå Planet opened in 2013 in Kastrup, a suburb of Copenhagen. It resembles a whirlpool when seen from above; it often is, being close to the Copenhagen Airport. It was designed by Danish architects 3XN. To reduce energy consumption the building is equipped with cooling units using seawater from Øresund and double glazing.

In the first year of existence, the aquarium received approximately 1.3 million visitors – twice as many as expected. To mitigate this extra wear, and in order to improve public education, 12.5 million DKK (approx. 2.3 million US$; 1.7 million €) were  spent on changes and renovations of the aquarium.

There are five main sections:

 The Rainforest The rainforest section is home to dwarf and Philippine crocodiles, arowanas, pacus, freshwater stingrays, large catfish, boa constrictors, violet turaco and more. This section also has an aquarium with a big school–about 3,000–of piranhas. Near the rainforest is the smaller grotto section, with aquaria for cave tetra, various electric fish (electric eel and elephantfish) and other fish found in dark freshwater habitats.

 The African Great Lakes Exhibits for Lake Malawi, Lake Tanganyika and Lake Victoria. Primarily aimed at cichlids, but also home to other fish such as Nile perch (highly predatory and therefore separated from the Victoria cichlids by acrylic glass), and the section above the aquaria are home to village weaver birds, and other small animals.

 Evolution and adaption Aimed at fish evolution and adaption, and contains a mangrove aquarium with four-eyed fish, archerfish, mudskippers and alike, as well as aquaria for Apalachicola snapping turtle and primitive fish such as bichir, gar and lungfish. This includes the oldest fish in the aquarium, an Australian lungfish that arrived at Denmark's Aquarium in Charlottenlund in 1967 when already a young adult (its full age is unknown).

 Cold Water Primarily home to native Danish species from fresh- and saltwater. Non-native species in or near the Cold Water section are giant Pacific octopus, sea anemones and more. This section also housed California sea lions for a period (their previous home, Bergen Aquarium in Norway was being renovated). In early 2014 they were moved to a permanent home at La Palmyre Zoo, France. Following modifications, a pair of sea otters moved into the former sea lion exhibit in October 2014, making the aquarium one of only three places where this species can be seen Europe (the others being Lisbon Oceanarium, Portugal and Oceanopolis in Brest, France.)

 The Warm Ocean This section contains the largest aquarium in Blue Planet, the  Ocean tank. There are also various smaller aquaria with species such as shrimpfish, weedy seadragon, seahorses, a Mediterranean aquarium, and the highly venomous stonefish, lionfish and olive sea snake.

References

External links

 
 
  Denmark Zoo Central

Aquaria in Denmark
Tourist attractions in the Capital Region of Denmark
3XN buildings
Cultural infrastructure completed in 2013
1939 establishments in Denmark
Museums established in 1939